The Schempp-Hirth SHK Open Class glider was developed in Germany by Schempp-Hirth.  It was based on the 1964 version of the Standard Austria, known as the SH. The Austria was originally a single-seat aerobatic glider that had been designed and built in Austria from 1959 but production was moved in 1962 to the Schempp-Hirth factory in Germany.

Development 
In addition to its larger span, the SHK's V-tail surfaces were 50% larger than the Austria and there were other improvements. The tailplane was "all-moving", mass-balanced, and had aerodynamic trim tabs. An SHK flown by Rolf Kuntz finished in 3rd place in the Open Class of the 1965 World Gliding Championships at South Cerney in England. In 1967 a model with improved comfort for the pilot was introduced and a tail chute was provided. The SHK was probably the last mainly wooden Open Class glider to be developed before glass fiber aircraft became available.

Specifications (SHK)

See also

References

Notes

Bibliography

 Gliders and Sailplanes Of The World, Michael Hardy, Ian Allan, 1982, 

 Schempp-Hirth Flight and Maintenance manual for SHK #49, Schempp-Hirth KG, kirchheim-Teck,
March, 1965

External links

 Sailplanedirectory.com - Schempp-Hirth SHK

SHK
1960s German sailplanes
V-tail aircraft
Aircraft first flown in 1965